Kirstin Sheree Dwyer (born 15 March 1989) is an Australian field hockey player. She is a member of the Australia women's national field hockey team.

She represented her country at the 2015 Oceania Cup, and the 2016 Summer Olympics.

Kirstin was raised on a cane farm in Central Queensland by parents, Trish and Ian. She is one of three siblings with brother Reece and sister, Alyscia.

Kirstin currently plays for Perth Womens Premier 1's team Suburban Lions,  and plays an integral part in their inability to score up front. Kirstin's ability to dramatise her efforts by falling over when attempting to make even the simplest of passes has seen her make a name for herself at this prestigious hockey club located in the golden triangle.

References

External links
 
 
 

1989 births
Living people
Sportspeople from Mackay, Queensland
Australian female field hockey players
Field hockey players at the 2016 Summer Olympics
Olympic field hockey players of Australia
21st-century Australian women
Sportswomen from Queensland